Prosphymaspis is an extinct genus of placoderm fish, which lived during the Late Devonian period of Europe.

References 

Placoderms of Europe
Phlyctaeniidae